Haigh is a hamlet, straddling the counties of South and West Yorkshire in England. It is split between the Barnsley and Wakefield districts. Historically within the West Riding of Yorkshire, it grew as a pit village and had its own colliery until 1968. Thereafter, Woolley Colliery became the main source of employment until its closure in 1987.

References

Villages in West Yorkshire
Villages in South Yorkshire
Geography of the Metropolitan Borough of Barnsley
Geography of the City of Wakefield